No. 281 Squadron was a Royal Air Force air-sea rescue squadron during the Second World War.

History
No. 281 Squadron was formed at RAF Ouston, England on 29 March 1942 as an air-sea rescue squadron. The squadron was equipped with the Supermarine Walrus and the Avro Anson. The squadron disbanded on 22 November 1942 when it was absorbed by 282 Squadron.

The squadron reformed at RAF Thornaby on 22 November 1943 with the Vickers Warwick. The squadron moved to Tiree in February 1945 to provide air-sea rescue cover for Northern Ireland and western Scotland.

At the end of the Second World War the squadron disbanded at RAF Ballykelly on 24 October 1945.

Aircraft operated

Notes

References 
 Halley, James J. The Squadrons of the Royal Air Force and Commonwealth, 1918–1988. Tonbridge, Kent, UK: Air Britain (Historians) Ltd., 1988. .
 Jefford, C.G. RAF Squadrons: A Comprehensive Record of the Movement and Equipment of All RAF Squadrons and Their Antecedents Since 1912, Shrewsbury, Shropshire, UK: Airlife Publishing, 1988. . (second revised edition 2001. .)
 Rawlings, John D.R. Coastal, Support and Special Squadrons of the RAF and their Aircraft. London: Jane's Publishing Company Ltd., 1982. .

External links
 squadron histories nos. 281–285 sqn

Aircraft squadrons of the Royal Air Force in World War II
281 Squadron
Rescue aviation units and formations
Military units and formations established in 1942
Military units and formations disestablished in 1945